Scott Harris may refer to:
Scott S. Harris (born 1965), clerk of the United States Supreme Court
Scott Harris (baseball), American baseball executive
Scott Harris (songwriter), American songwriter, producer and musician
Scott Foster Harris, American singer, songwriter and musician
Scott Harris, founder and distiller of Catoctin Creek Distilling Company

See also
Scott v. Harris, a case heard before the United States Supreme Court in February, 2007